Numis is an independent institutional stockbroker and corporate advisor with its main headquarters in the City of London. By the autumn of 2017, the firm had 195 stock market clients, and a February 2018 report by Adviser Rankings Ltd found that it was broker to eleven of the largest fifty firms in London's Alternative Investment Market. It currently employs around 235 staff in London and New York City.

The firm was originally formed in 1989 as a merger between Hemsley & Co Securities and Raphael Zorn and was known by the name of RZH Ltd before rebranding as Numis in 2000.

In 2016, Oliver Hemsley stood down as Numis CEO after 25 years. Alex Ham and Ross Mitchinson succeeded Hemsley as co-CEOs, with Ham running the firm's advisory and corporate broking arm and Mitchinson its equities business.

References

Financial services companies based in London
Companies listed on the Alternative Investment Market